The Lady from Trévelez (Spanish:La señorita de Trevélez) may refer to:

 The Lady from Trévelez (play), a 1916 play by Carlos Arniches
 The Lady from Trévelez (film), a 1935 film directed by Edgar Neville

See also
 Calle Mayor (1956), another adaptation of the play